Castro is a Romance language word that originally derived from Latin castrum, a pre-Roman military camp or fortification (cf: Greek: kastron; Proto-Celtic:*Kassrik). The English-language equivalent is chester.

It may refer to:

People 
 Castro (surname), a surname (including a list of people with the name)
 Fidel Castro (1926–2016), dictator of Cuba, former First Secretary of the Communist Party of Cuba
 José Castro (1808–1860), Mexican Californio politician, statesman, and general who served as interim Governor of Alta California and later Governor of Baja California
 Julián Castro (Venezuelan politician) (1810–1875) a Venezuelan military officer and President of Venezuela between 1858 and 1859
 Julian Castro (b. 1974), American politician from San Antonio
 Raúl Castro (b. 1931), younger brother of Fidel Castro, former First Secretary of the Communist Party of Cuba
 Xiomara Castro (b. 1959), president of Honduras and wife of former Honduran president Manuel Zelaya
 de Castro, a Portuguese surname
 House of Castro, a Spanish noble family
 Prince Carlo, Duke of Castro, claimant to the headship of the royal House of Bourbon-Two Sicilies
 A nickname of Martin Castrogiovanni (born 1981), Argentine-born Italian rugby player
 Castro (footballer), the mononym of Santiago Castro Anido, Spanish footballer

Places and jurisdictions 
 Roman Catholic Diocese of Castro (disambiguation)
 Castro Barros (disambiguation)
 Castro Street (disambiguation)
 Castro City (disambiguation)

Brazil
 Castro, Paraná, a municipality in the state of Paraná in the Southern Region of Brazil.

Chile
 Castro, Chile

Greece
 Curiate Italian designation for the Latin Catholic titular bishopric of Moglæna, now Almopia, a municipality of the Pella regional unit in Greek Macedonia.

Italy
 Castro, Apulia, a comune (municipality) in the province of Lecce
 the former Roman Catholic Diocese of Castro di Puglia, now a Latin Catholic titular see
 Castro, Lazio, a destroyed town in the province of Viterbo
 the former Roman Catholic Diocese of Castro del Lazio, now a Latin Catholic titular see
 Castro, Lombardy, a comune in the province of Bergamo
 Castel di Castro, 13th century fortified city at the site of modern Cagliari, Sardinia
 A former town within the comune of Oschiri, Sardinia
 the former Roman Catholic Diocese of Castro di Sardegna, now a Latin Catholic titular see

Mexico 

 Castro, Baja California

Spain 
 Castro (Soria)
 Castros (Spain)
 Castro Urdiales, Cantabria

Switzerland
 Castro, Ticino

United States
 Castro County, Texas
 Castro Cove, an embayment of the San Pablo Bay in Richmond, California
 Castro Creek, a creek in Richmond, California
 Castro Street Station, a Metro station in San Francisco, California
 Castro Theatre, a movie theater in San Francisco, California
 The Castro, San Francisco, a neighborhood in San Francisco, California
 Castro Valley, California, a census-designated place in Alameda County

Other uses
 Castro culture, Iron-Age, Bronze-Age and Celtic culture in the Northern Iberian Peninsula
Castros in Spain
Castro (village), types of settlements of the Castro culture
 Castro (clothing), an Israel-based clothing company
 "Castro" (song), a 2016 song by Yo Gotti
 Wars of Castro, conflict between the Papacy and the Farnese dukes of Parma
 Castro FC, Spanish football team
 Jose Castro House, historic Monterey Colonial adobe house built in 1840

See also
 Castor (disambiguation)
 Castro brothers (disambiguation)
 Castrum
 De castro family (disambiguation)
 Duke of Castro (disambiguation)
 Gastro-, common English-language prefix derived from the ancient Greek γαστήρ gastēr ("stomach")
 Kastro (disambiguation)